Splinter is a political party in the Netherlands. It was founded in December 2020 by Femke Merel van Kooten, who has led it since and served as its lijsttrekker in the 2021 general election. It has a progressive, secular and social liberal ideology.

History 
The party was founded in December 2020 by Femke Merel van Kooten-Arissen, who had been an independent member of the House of Representatives since 16 July 2019. She was first elected for the Party for the Animals in the 2017 election. The party participated in the 2021 election, but did not receive enough votes for a seat in the House of Representatives.

The party's logo is a multi-colored phoenix, a mythical creature reborn from its own ashes over and over again. It is a reference to the COVID-19 pandemic from which the Netherlands will have to resurrect, but the phoenix also symbolizes the political career of Van Kooten-Arissen.

In 2020, the party was offered a 250,000 Euro donation by a Russian citizen, Vadim Belikov, a co-founder of the Night Wolves movement. The party rejected it and notified Dutch security services.

Structure and ideology 
Splinter claims to be characterized by a "flat" party structure. Via its member platform Fractiekamer, members are able to comment directly on the election program, and to submit motions and amendments.

The party has a social liberal and secular ideology. It states that religious expressions and freedoms that restrict others in their expressions and freedoms must not be tolerated.

References

Political parties in the Netherlands
Political parties established in 2020